Slateng is a village in Ledokombo District, Jember Regency in East Java Province. Its population is 8630.

Climate
Slateng has a subtropical highland climate (Cfb). It has moderate rainfall from June to October and heavy to very heavy rainfall from November to May.

References

Villages in East Java